A news cinema or newsreel theatre is a cinema specialising in short films, shown in a continuous manner. However, despite its name, a news cinema does not necessarily show only cinematographical news.

Timeline 
The first official news cinema, The Daily Bioscope, opened in London on 23 May 1909. In the United States, however, the apparition of a dedicated news cinema came much later, the first being the Embassy Theatre on Broadway, New York City, which opened in 1925 as a first-run theater before Loew's Inc. converted it into a news theater on 2 November 1929. However, because of competition with television news, it reverted into a first-run theater in 1949. 

In England in 1951, however, when Seebohm Rowntree published his study on English Life and Leisure, he counted "approximately 20 news cinemas in London", and "very few [...] in the provinces, probably not more than a dozen in all". According to Rowntree, a population of at least 300,000 was needed in a town for a news cinema to be sustainable. London Victoria Station had a news cinema (later a cartoon cinema) that would show a continuous programme for travellers. The cinema was designed by Alister MacDonald, son of Prime Minister Ramsay MacDonald and was in operation from 1933 until being demolished in 1981.

Shows 
The original programmes of news cinemas featured mainly of newsreels, possibly with a short subject or travelogue. Afterward, newsreels came to occupy a shorter length of the programme, replaced by other, more entertaining elements. Programs typically lasted one hour, and were shown continuously, without any interval between performances.

Actor Peter O'Toole, who grew up in Leeds in the 1930s, reported in an interview with Roger Ebert that his father often took him to a nearby news cinema. When he was six, in 1938, he saw in that news cinema a program including the Three Stooges, Donald Duck, the Ritz Brothers, and news footage, including footage of Benito Mussolini and Adolf Hitler.

Seebohm Rowntree, in 1951, similarly reports that "the news films occupy only a comparatively small part of the programme, largely because public interest in news films has declined". According to him, they have been replaced with cartoons, travelogues, or films on such general subjects as sports, fashion, or domestic economy.

Notes and references

External links
Newsreel Theatre 

Cinemas and movie theaters
Newsreels